The following are the winners of the 22nd annual (1995) Origins Award, presented at Origins 1996:

External links
 1995 Origins Awards Winners

1995 awards
Origins Award winners
1995 awards in the United States